Arnaud Lebrun (born 1973) is a retired French football defender.

His previous clubs include Valenciennes FC, Amiens SC, Stade Laval and Chamois Niortais.

External links
Arnaud Lebrun profile at chamoisfc79.fr 
Arnaud Lebrun at Footballdatabase

1973 births
Living people
French footballers
Valenciennes FC players
Amiens SC players
Stade Lavallois players
Chamois Niortais F.C. players
Dijon FCO players
GOAL FC players
Ligue 2 players
Championnat National 2 players
Association football defenders